Tawanda Mupariwa (born 16 April 1985) is a Zimbabwean cricketer. He is a right arm fast-medium seam bowler who was brought into the international side after the record low 35 all out in the third One Day International (ODI) against Sri Lanka. He became the fastest player for Zimbabwe to take 50 wickets in ODIs, achieving it in 28 games. He also played in one Test match in 2004.

References

External links
 

1985 births
Living people
Matabeleland cricketers
Zimbabwe One Day International cricketers
Zimbabwe Test cricketers
Zimbabwe Twenty20 International cricketers
Zimbabwean cricketers
Cricketers at the 2007 Cricket World Cup
Cricketers at the 2015 Cricket World Cup